Sarah Tucker may refer to:
 Sarah Tucker (diplomat), English diplomat, governor of Montserrat
 Sarah Tucker (model), Sierra Leonean model and beauty pageant titleholder

See also
 Sarah Tucker College, an institution in Palayamkottai, Tamil Nadu, India
 Sara Tucker, American chief executive officer of the National Math and Science Initiative